Leslie David Andersen (born 11 December 1939) is a New Zealand former cricketer. He played in five first-class cricket matches for Auckland and Northern Districts between 1960 and 1968.

See also
 List of Auckland representative cricketers

References

External links
 

1939 births
Living people
New Zealand cricketers
Auckland cricketers
Northern Districts cricketers
Cricketers from Melbourne